The Greek People's Liberation Army (Ellinikós Laïkós Apeleftherotikós Stratós (ELAS) was the military arm of the left-wing National Liberation Front (EAM) during the period of the Greek resistance until February 1945, when, following the Dekemvriana clashes and the Varkiza Agreement, it was disarmed and disbanded. ELAS was the largest and most significant of the military organizations of the Greek resistance.

Birth of ELAS

After Nazi Germany attacked the Soviet Union with the initiation of Operation Barbarossa (June 22, 1941) — with most of Greece having fallen under Axis occupation since April and the Battle of Crete having ended on June 1 — the Greek Communist Party (KKE) called for national resistance. The KKE, together with minor parties of the Left, formed a political structure called the National Liberation Front. They were joined by other center-left or non-politicized Greek Resistance militants.

On February 16, 1942, EAM gave permission to a communist veteran, Athanasios (Thanasis) Klaras (later known as Aris Velouchiotis) to examine the possibilities of an armed resistance movement, which led to the Greek People's Liberation Army (ELAS). ELAS initiated actions against the German and Italian forces of occupation in Greece on 7 June 1942. Velouchiotis, with a small group of 10–15 guerrillas, entered the village of Domnista in Evrytania and proclaimed in front of the surprised villagers that they were about to "start the war against the forces of Axis and their local collaborators". Initially, Velouchiotis also recruited traditional local mountain-living bandits, like Dimos Karalivanos, in order to create a small group of experts in guerilla warfare.

Consolidation of strength

Gorgopotamos

On a night in September 1942, a small group of British SOE officers parachuted into Greece near Mt. Giona. This group, led by Brigadier Eddie Myers, had been tasked to blow up one of three bridges (Gorgopotamos, Papadia or Asopos) of the country's main railway line, and to get the two main, but competing, guerrilla groups of ELAS and EDES to cooperate.

After much deliberation, the Gorgopotamos bridge was chosen due to the difficulty of making repairs to the structure. Dimos Karalivanos, an ELAS guerrilla, was the first guerrilla the British found. At the end of October a second group of British officers were parachuted into the Greek mountains. Their leaders were Themis Marinos and Colonel Christopher Woodhouse. Their mission was to locate the guerrillas of EDES and their leader Napoleon Zervas, who were friendlier to the British Middle East Command than ELAS, and co-operate with them. The two Greek groups eventually agreed to collaborate. The British did not favour the participation of ELAS, because it was a pro-communist group, but the forces of ELAS were larger and better organised, and without their participation, the mission was more likely to fail.

On November 14, the 12 British saboteurs, the forces of ELAS (150 men) and those of EDES (60-65 men) met in the village of Viniani in Evrytania and the operation started. Ten days later, they were at Gorgopotamos. On the night of November 25, at 23:00, the guerrillas started the attack against the Italian garrison. The Italians were startled, and after little resistance, were defeated. After the defeat of the Italians, the saboteurs set the explosives. ELAS forces had placed ambushes on the routes towards the bridge, to block the approach of Italian reinforcements. The explosion occurred at 03:00. Afterwards, the guerrillas' forces returned to Viniani, to celebrate the success of the mission.

The destruction of the Gorgopotamos bridge was, along with the Norwegian heavy water sabotage in Rjukan, one of the two biggest guerrilla acts in occupied Europe. The blowing up of the bridge disrupted the German transportation of ammunition via Greece to Rommel's forces for several weeks, taking place at a time when the Afrika Korps in North Africa, retreating after the defeat of El Alamein, were in need of supplies.

Expansion of ELAS

The blowing up of Gorgopotamos bridge favored ELAS. Soon, many the inhabitants of the villages of Central Greece became members of ELAS. Furthermore, people sympathised with the ELAS guerrillas because they weren't helped by the British in contrast with EDES. When 25 guerrillas deserted from ELAS, Aris Velouchiotis went to Epirus to threaten Napoleon Zervas not to come in touch with them. Later, the 25 deserters were arrested and executed in the village of Sperhiada. The winter of 1942, ELAS groups were formed in other Greek regions, like Thessaly and Macedonia. In Central Greece, Aris Velouchiotis succeeded to form a powerful semi-conventional army which could attack German and Italian forces. Aris became a legendary figure who imposed an iron discipline in ELAS. At the same time, some members of ELAS (Periklis, Tasos Leuterias, Diamantis, Nikiforos, Thiseas, Dimos Karalivanos, and Belis) have been distinguished during the battles. Aris Velouchiotis formed a group of 30–35 men, called "Mavroskoufides" (the "black caps"), who were his personal guards. During the winter of 1942–1943, new units of ELAS were composed in many regions of Greece. Some areas in the mountains of Central Greece passed from the control of Axis forces to that of ELAS.

The leadership of ELAS followed a triadic form, from its top down to platoon level: the captain (kapetánios), elected by the men and the overall leader of the unit, the military specialist (stratiotikós), usually a regular Army officer, responsible for tactical planning and training, and the political leader (politikós), usually a KKE member, as EAM's representative. At its top, the General Headquarters of ELAS, these positions were filled by Aris Velouchiotis, Stefanos Sarafis and Andreas Tzimas (nom-de-guerre: Vasilis Samariniotis).

Two events of great importance took place in this period. KKE, after passing great difficulties, succeeded in reorganizing its groups destroyed by Metaxas. Many members were recruited and with the help of ELAS, which became the largest partisan army in Greece, EAM became the largest mass political organization in Greek history, claiming over 1.5 million members, enlisted in organizations that covered every neighborhood in every village. The second great event was the foundation of the United Panhellenic Organization of Youth (EPON). In 1943, a small naval auxiliary navy, the Greek People's Liberation Navy (ELAN) was also founded.

Two years after its foundation, ELAS' military strength had grown from the small group of fighters in Domnitsa to a force of some 50,000 partisans (estimates of the British government) or even as many as 85,000, according to EAM sources; EAM itself, and its associated organizations, had grown to a membership of anywhere from 500,000 to 750,000 (according to Anthony Eden) up to two million, in a country of 7.5 million inhabitants. ELAS was thus one of the largest resistance groups formed in Europe, similar to the French Maquis, the Italian Resistance and the Yugoslavian Partisans, but smaller than the Polish resistance.

The "Mountain Government"

On 10 March 1944 the EAM-ELAS, now in control of most of the country, established the Political Committee of National Liberation (PEEA), widely known as the "Mountain Government", in effect a third Greek government to rival the collaboration one in Athens and the government-in-exile in Cairo. Its aims, according to its founding Act, were, "to intensify the struggle against the conquerors (...) for full national liberation, for the consolidation of the independence and integrity of our country (...) and for the annihilation of domestic fascism and armed traitor formations."

PEEA was elected in liberated territories and in occupied ones by 2,000,000 Greek citizens. It was historically the first time women could vote. PEEA ministers covered a wide political spectrum from left to center.

1943: First Civil War

After the Soviet victory in the Battle of Stalingrad in early 1943, it was clear that Axis would lose the war. Soon, clashes appeared between the various Resistance organizations regarding the post-war political situation in Greece.

In October 1943 ELAS launched major attacks against EDES and the guerrilla group of Tsaous Anton in Northern Greece, precipitating a civil war across many parts of Greece which continued until February 1944, when the British agents in Greece negotiated a ceasefire (the Plaka agreement); ELAS broke the agreement by attacking the 5/42 Evzone Regiment, murdering the EKKA resistance group leader, Dimitrios Psarros, in as yet unclear and hotly debated circumstances and executing all the captives.

ELAS became the strongest of all resistance armed organizations, controlling by 1944 military three-fifths of the country (mainly the mountains) having in its ranks more than 800 military officers of the former National Army Of Negrs. ELAS engaged in battles against other resistance groups, besides the para-military forces of the collaborationist government. ELAS initially began to attack the National Republican Greek League (EDES) on accusations of collaboration with the Germans. ELAS attacked also the Panhellenic Liberation Organization (PAO), another resistance organization, concentrated in Northern Greece, in the area of Macedonia with accusations of collaboration. The armed power of the two major organizations was not comparable, as EDES had approx. 12,000 guerrillas, while ELAS' power was much stronger. Small battles were taking place in Epirus where EDES had its main force. This situation led to triangular battles among ELAS, EDES and the Germans. Given the support of the British and the Greek Cairo Government for EDES, these conflicts precipitated a civil war.

Αftermath
In autumn 1944, after the liberation, ELAS was the dominant force in the country and had captured all the major Greek cities, except Athens (after an agreement in Caserta with the Greek government in exile).

After the events of the Dekemvriana, ELAS was disarmed, though later some of its fighters (mostly KKE members) joined the Democratic Army during the civil war.

Hymn
The hymn of ELAS was written in March 1944 by Sofia Mavroeidi-Papadaki and music by Nikos Tsakonas.

List of important battles
1942
 The battle of Reka (40 Italians killed)
 The battle of Mikro Chorio (70 Italians killed)
 November 1942 – The battle of Gorgopotamos
1943
 March 1943 – The battle of Fardykambos (together with PAO, 95 Italians killed)
 June 1943 – The destruction of the Kournovo Tunnel (c.100 Italians killed)
 July 1943 – The battle of Myrtia
 The battle of Sarantaporo (99 Germans killed)
 The battle of Porta (many Italians killed)
 September 1943 – The battle of Arachova
1944
 March 1944 – The battle of Kokkinia
 April 1944 – The battle of Kaisariani  
 June 1944 – The battle of Steiri (40 Germans killed)
 July 1944 – The battle of Chora - Agorelitsa (180 Germans killed)  
 July 1944 – The battle of Amfilochia  
blowing up a German train in Tempe under the guidance of the chief saboteur of Elas Antonis Vratsanos in 1944 with 450 German soldiers dead
 The capture of Kastoria
 The capture of Elefsina military airport
 September 1944 – Battle of Kalamata
 September 1944 – Battle of Meligalas

List of important ELAS members

This list contains the names of the most well-known ELAS leaders or simple members, with their nom de guerre in parentheses:

 Athanasios Klaras (Aris Velouchiotis), chief captain of ELAS
 Colonel Stefanos Sarafis, chief military expert of ELAS
 Andreas Tzimas (Vasilis Samariniotis), chief political commissioner of ELAS
 Georgios Siantos
 Major General Neokosmos Grigoriadis (Lambros), Chairman of ELAS Central Committee
 Lieutenant General Ptolemaios Sarigiannis, Chief of Staff of ELAS Central Committee
 Colonel Evripidis Bakirtzis, commander of ELAS' Macedonian theatre
 Captain Theodoros Makridis (Ektoras), one of ELAS chief staff officers
 Alexandros Rosios (Ypsilantis)
 Markos Vafiadis, Macedonian theatre
 Nikos Beloyannis
 Charilaos Florakis (Kapetan Jiotis)
 Vasilis Liropoulos (Kapetan Liras), Macedonian theatre
 Iannis Xenakis
  Giannis Aggeletos (Leon Tzavelas), blackberet
 Giannis Economou (Giannoutsos), blackberet
 Panos Tzavelas
 Evangelos Yannopoulos (Varjianis)
 Father Dimitrios Holevas (Papa-Holevas, Papaflessas)
 Father Germanos Dimakos (Papa-Anypomonos)
 Alberto Errera
 Moisis Michail Bourlas (Byron)
 Fotis Mastrokostas (Thanos), blackberet
 Kostas Kavretzis (Kostoulas Agrafiotis), blackberet
 Stavros Mavrothalassitis
 Babis Klaras, brother of Aris Velouchiotis
 Giannis Madonis (Ektoras), blackberet
 Giannis Nikolopoulos (Leon), blackberet
 Dimitrios Dimitriou (Nikiforos)
 Giorgos Houliaras (Periklis)
 Pantelis Laskas (Pelopidas), blackberet
 Epaminontas Chairopoulos (Karaiskakis), blackberet
 Ioannis Alexandrou (Diamantis)
 Lambros Koumbouras (Achilleas)
 Spyros Tsiligiannis (Lefteris Chrysiotis), blackberet
 Kostas Athanasiou (Doulas), blackberet
 Sarantos Kapourelakos, serving directly under Velouchiotis' command.
 Spyros Bekios (Lambros)
 Dimitrios Tassos (Boukouvalas)
 Thomas Pallas (Kozakas)
 Nikos Xinos (Smolikas)
 Vangelis Papadakis (Tassos Lefterias)
 Vasilis Priovolos (Ermis)
 Giannis Podias, Cretan theatre
 Michalis Samaritis, Cretan theatre
 Gerasimos Avgeropoulos
 Andreas Zacharopoulos (Andreas Patrinos)
 Ioannis Hatzipanagiotou (Thomas)
 Filotas Adamidis (Katsonis), Macedonian theatre
 Mirka Ginova (Irene Gini), Macedonian theatre
 Christos Margaritis (Armatolos)
 Georgios Zarogiannis (Kavallaris)
 Vasilis Ganatsios (Cheimarros)
 Panagiotis G. Tesseris, Secretary of the ELAS Guerrilla Warfare Training Committee (Laconia Region)

See also
Refugees of the Greek Civil War

References

Sources
 
 
 
 
 
 
 
 
 

 
Left-wing militant groups in Greece
Guerrilla organizations
Greece in World War II
Military wings of communist parties
National liberation armies
1942 establishments in Greece